Başak Ersoy (born October 23, 1991) is a Turkish women's football midfielder currently playing in the Turkish Women's Second Football League  for FAdana İdmanyurduspor in the Turkish Women's Super League with jersey number 19. She was member of the Turkey women's national team between 2008 and 2012.

Career

Club
Başak Ersoy obtained her license on April 30, 2004. She played in the local team Mersin Camspor until the end of 2009.  In February 2010, she moved to Gazi Üniversitesispor in Ankara.  For the 2010–11 season, she transferred to Ataşehir Belediyespor in Istanbul, where she played three seasons. Currently, she is part of the Second League team Ağrı Birlik Spor.

Ersoy moved to Osmaniye Demirspor in the 2017-18 Women's Second League season. The next season, her club was renamed to Osmaniye Kadın Spor.

In 2019, she transferred to the Women's First League club Adana İdmanyurduspor. In the 2021-22 season, she plays in the renamed league of Women's Super League.

International
She was member of the national U-17, U-19 and the senior teams. She took part at five matches of the UEFA Women's Euro 2013 qualifying – Group 2 round.

Career statistics
.

Honours
 Turkish Women's First Football League
 Gazi Üniversitesispor
 Winners (1):2009–10

 Ataşehir Belediyespor
 Winners (2): 2010–11, 2011–12
 Runners-up (1): 2012–13

References

External links
 

1991 births
Living people
Sportspeople from Mersin
Turkish women's footballers
Turkey women's international footballers
Women's association football midfielders
Gazi Üniversitesispor players
Ataşehir Belediyespor players
Hakkarigücü Spor players
Adana İdmanyurduspor players
Turkish Women's Football Super League players
20th-century Turkish sportswomen
21st-century Turkish sportswomen